Kurt Tanzer (1 November 1920 – 25 June 1960) was a World War II Luftwaffe military aviator. As a flying ace, he is credited with approximately 128–143 aerial victories. He was a recipient of the Knight's Cross of the Iron Cross, the highest award in the military and paramilitary forces of Nazi Germany during World War II. He later joined the German Air Force and was killed in a flying accident on 25 June 1960.

Career
Tanzer was born on 1 November 1920 in Moscow. On 18 March 1942, he was transferred from the Ergänzungsgruppe, a supplementary training group, of Jagdgeschwader 51 "Mölders" (JG 51—51st Fighter Wing), named after Werner Mölders, to 12. Staffel (12th squadron) of JG 51, and commanded by Hauptmann Heinrich Bär. 12. Staffel was a squadron of IV. Gruppe (4th group) which was based at an airfield in Vyazma on the Eastern Front and largely equipped with the Messerschmitt Bf 109 F-2. In May, the Gruppe was briefly withdrawn from combat for a period of maintenance and equipment overhaul at Smolensk. The Gruppe was then sent to Novodugino where it was tasked with providing fighter cover over the left flank of Army Group Center in vicinity of the 9th Army.

On 30 July 1942, the Soviet Kalinin Front launched the First Rzhev–Sychyovka Offensive Operation with the objective to crush the Rzhev salient held by the 9th Army. Tanzer claimed his first aerial victory on 2 August 1942 over an Ilyushin Il-2 ground attack aircraft west of Rzhev.

Tanzer achieved his 35th victory on 5 May 1943. On 6 May, Soviet Ilyushin Il-2 attacked the airfield where Tanzer was stationed. He managed to scramble and destroyed two Ilyushin Il-2. Despite being wounded, he continued attacking the raiding Soviet aircraft and shot down two more aircraft. After further intense battle, Tanzer landed his heavily damaged Focke-Wulf Fw 190 A-7 (Werknummer 7161—factory number). Tanzer's right hand was seriously injured and he suffered from heavy blood loss. For this action, he was mentioned in the Honour Roll of the Luftwaffe and was nominated for the Knight's Cross of the Iron Cross.

Following a period of convalescence, Tanzer returned to JG 51 and was assigned to the Stabsstaffel (headquarters unit) on 4 November.  He received the Knight's Cross on 5 December 1943 for 35 victories. With the Stabsstaffel, he flew a number of ground attack missions and increased the number of his aerial victories. In June 1944, Tanzer accompanied Karl-Gottfried Nordmann to the staff of Jagdfliegerführer 6. He achieved his 100th victory in the same month in 1944 while serving with this formation. He was the 81st Luftwaffe pilot to achieve the century mark. He was then transferred to the staff of Jagdfliegerführer in East Prussia on 1 September 1944. Tanzer was transferred to 13. Staffel of JG 51 on 10 February 1945 and was appointed Staffelkapitän of the unit on 12 April.

Later life and death

Following World War II, Tanzer joined the post-war Bundesluftwaffe. Hauptmann Tanzer and Oberleutnant Hans-Ludwig Seseke, were killed on 25 June 1960 when their Lockheed T-33A "EB+397" crashed in southwestern Mallorca. T-33 "EB+397" and T-33 "BD+843", piloted by United States Air Force Captain Charles S. Melton and Captain Roger P. Miller, both crashed into the cloud-covered mountains during an instrument flight rules (IFR) approach on Son Sant Joan Airport. All four pilots were killed in the incident. Tanzer and Seseke are listed on the Ehrenmal der Bundeswehr (Bundeswehr Memorial).

Summary of career

Aerial victory claims
According to Spick, Tanzer claimed 143 aerial victories in 723 combat missions, 187 of which were ground attack missions. This figure includes 126 claims on the Eastern Front, and 17 on the Western Front, four of them being four-engined bombers. Mathews and Foreman, authors of Luftwaffe Aces — Biographies and Victory Claims, researched the German Federal Archives and state that he claimed at least 35 aerial victories, all of which claimed on the Eastern Front. The claim that he is attributed with 128 or even 143 aerial victories cannot be verified through the archives.

Victory claims were logged to a map-reference (PQ = Planquadrat), for example "PQ 47581". These sectors were then subdivided into 36 smaller units to give a location area 3 × 4 km in size.

Awards
 Iron Cross (1939) 2nd and 1st Class
 Honour Goblet of the Luftwaffe on 15 February 1943 as Feldwebel and pilot
 German Cross in Gold on 24 June 1943 as Feldwebel in the 12./Jagdgeschwader 51
 Knight's Cross of the Iron Cross on 5 December 1943 as Oberfeldwebel and pilot of the 12./Jagdgeschwader 51 "Mölders"

Notes

References

Citations

Bibliography

 
 
 
 
 
 
 
 
 
 
 
 
 

1920 births
1960 deaths
Luftwaffe pilots
German World War II flying aces
Recipients of the Gold German Cross
Recipients of the Knight's Cross of the Iron Cross
Aviators killed in aviation accidents or incidents in Spain
German Air Force pilots
Victims of aviation accidents or incidents in 1960